In control theory, backstepping is a technique developed circa 1990 by Petar V. Kokotovic and others for designing stabilizing controls for a special class of nonlinear dynamical systems. These systems are built from subsystems that radiate out from an irreducible subsystem that can be stabilized using some other method. Because of this recursive structure, the designer can start the design process at the known-stable system and "back out" new controllers that progressively stabilize each outer subsystem. The process terminates when the final external control is reached. Hence, this process is known as backstepping.

Backstepping approach
The backstepping approach provides a recursive method for stabilizing the origin of a system in strict-feedback form. That is, consider a system of the form

where
  are scalars,
  is a scalar input to the system,
  vanish at the origin (i.e.),
  are nonzero over the domain of interest (i.e.,  for ).

Also assume that the subsystem

is stabilized to the origin (i.e.) by some known control  such that . It is also assumed that a Lyapunov function  for this stable subsystem is known. That is, this  subsystem is stabilized by some other method and backstepping extends its stability to the  shell around it.

In systems of this strict-feedback form around a stable  subsystem,
 The backstepping-designed control input  has its most immediate stabilizing impact on state .
 The state  then acts like a stabilizing control on the state  before it.
 This process continues so that each state  is stabilized by the fictitious "control" .
The backstepping approach determines how to stabilize the  subsystem using , and then proceeds with determining how to make the next state  drive  to the control required to stabilize . Hence, the process "steps backward" from  out of the strict-feedback form system until the ultimate control  is designed.

Recursive Control Design Overview

 It is given that the smaller (i.e., lower-order) subsystem

is already stabilized to the origin by some control  where . It is also assumed that a Lyapunov function  for this stable subsystem is known. Backstepping provides a way to extend the controlled stability of this subsystem to the larger system.
 A control  is designed so that the system

is stabilized so that  follows the desired  control. The control design is based on the augmented Lyapunov function candidate

 A control  is designed so that the system

is stabilized so that  follows the desired  control. The control design is based on the augmented Lyapunov function candidate

 This process continues until the actual  is known, and
 The real control  stabilizes  to fictitious control .
 The fictitious control  stabilizes  to fictitious control .
 The fictitious control  stabilizes  to fictitious control .
 ...
 The fictitious control  stabilizes  to fictitious control .
 The fictitious control  stabilizes  to fictitious control .
 The fictitious control  stabilizes  to the origin.

This process is known as backstepping because it starts with the requirements on some internal subsystem for stability and progressively steps back out of the system, maintaining stability at each step. Because
 the given control  has ,

Integrator Backstepping

Before describing the backstepping procedure for general strict-feedback form dynamical systems, it is convenient to discuss the approach for a smaller class of strict-feedback form systems. These systems connect a series of integrators to the input of a
system with a known feedback-stabilizing control law, and so the stabilizing approach is known as integrator backstepping. With a small modification, the integrator backstepping approach can be extended to handle all strict-feedback form systems.

Single-integrator Equilibrium

Consider the dynamical system

This system is a cascade connection of an integrator with the  subsystem (i.e., the input  enters an integrator, and the integral  enters the  subsystem).

So the origin  is an equilibrium (i.e., a stationary point) of the system. If the system ever reaches the origin, it will remain there forever after.

Single-integrator Backstepping

In this example, backstepping is used to stabilize the single-integrator system in Equation () around its equilibrium at the origin. To be less precise, we wish to design a control law  that ensures that the states  return to  after the system is started from some arbitrary initial condition.

 First, by assumption, the subsystem

with  has a Lyapunov function  such that

where  is a positive-definite function. That is, we assume that we have already shown that this existing simpler  subsystem is stable (in the sense of Lyapunov). Roughly speaking, this notion of stability means that:
 The function  is like a "generalized energy" of the  subsystem. As the  states of the system move away from the origin, the energy  also grows.
 By showing that over time, the energy  decays to zero, then the  states must decay toward . That is, the origin  will be a stable equilibrium of the system – the  states will continuously approach the origin as time increases.
 The statement that  means that  is bounded away from zero for all points except where . That is, so long as the system is not at its equilibrium at the origin, its "energy" will be decreasing.
 Because the energy is always decaying, then the system must be stable; its trajectories must approach the origin.
Our task is to find a control  that makes our cascaded  system also stable. So we must find a new Lyapunov function candidate for this new system. That candidate will depend upon the control , and by choosing the control properly, we can ensure that it is decaying everywhere as well.

 Next, by adding and subtracting  (i.e., we don't change the system in any way because we make no net effect) to the  part of the larger  system, it becomes

which we can re-group to get

So our cascaded supersystem encapsulates the known-stable  subsystem plus some error perturbation generated by the integrator.

So

 Additionally, we let  so that  and

 We seek to stabilize this error system by feedback through the new control .

 From our existing Lyapunov function , we define the augmented Lyapunov function candidate

 So

 By distributing , we see that

 To ensure that  (i.e., to ensure stability of the supersystem), we pick the control law

 After distributing the  through,

 So our candidate Lyapunov function  is a true Lyapunov function, and our system is stable under this control law  (which corresponds the control law  because ). Using the variables from the original coordinate system, the equivalent Lyapunov function

 As discussed below, this Lyapunov function will be used again when this procedure is applied iteratively to multiple-integrator problem.

 Our choice of control  ultimately depends on all of our original state variables. In particular, the actual feedback-stabilizing control law

The function  comes from our known-stable  subsystem. The gain parameter  affects the convergence rate or our system. Under this control law, our system is stable at the origin .

 Recall that  in Equation () drives the input of an integrator that is connected to a subsystem that is feedback-stabilized by the control law . Not surprisingly, the control  has a  term that will be integrated to follow the stabilizing control law  plus some offset. The other terms provide damping to remove that offset and any other perturbation effects that would be magnified by the integrator.

Motivating Example: Two-integrator Backstepping
Before discussing the recursive procedure for the general multiple-integrator case, it is instructive to study the recursion present in the two-integrator case. That is, consider the dynamical system

This system is a cascade connection of the single-integrator system in Equation () with another integrator (i.e., the input  enters through an integrator, and the output of that integrator enters the system in Equation () by its  input).

By letting
 ,
 ,
 
then the two-integrator system in Equation () becomes the single-integrator system

By the single-integrator procedure, the control law  stabilizes the upper -to- subsystem using the Lyapunov function , and so Equation () is a new single-integrator system that is structurally equivalent to the single-integrator system in Equation (). So a stabilizing control  can be found using the same single-integrator procedure that was used to find .

Many-integrator backstepping

In the two-integrator case, the upper single-integrator subsystem was stabilized yielding a new single-integrator system that can be similarly stabilized. This recursive procedure can be extended to handle any finite number of integrators. This claim can be formally proved with mathematical induction. Here, a stabilized multiple-integrator system is built up from subsystems of already-stabilized multiple-integrator subsystems.

 First, consider the dynamical system

that has scalar input  and output states . Assume that
 so that the zero-input (i.e.) system is stationary at the origin . In this case, the origin is called an equilibrium of the system.
The feedback control law  stabilizes the system at the equilibrium at the origin.
That is, if output states  are fed back to the input  by the control law , then the output states (and the Lyapunov function) return to the origin after a single perturbation (e.g., after a nonzero initial condition or a sharp disturbance). This subsystem is stabilized by feedback control law .

 Next, connect an integrator to input  so that the augmented system has input  (to the integrator) and output states . The resulting augmented dynamical system is

This "cascade" system matches the form in Equation (), and so the single-integrator backstepping procedure leads to the stabilizing control law in Equation ().

This subsystem is stabilized by feedback control law , and the corresponding Lyapunov function from Equation () is

That is, under feedback control law , the Lyapunov function  decays to zero as the states return to the origin.

 Connect a new integrator to input  so that the augmented system has input  and output states . The resulting augmented dynamical system is

which is equivalent to the single-integrator system

This system matches the single-integrator structure of Equation (), and so the single-integrator backstepping procedure can be applied again.

This subsystem is stabilized by feedback control law , and the corresponding Lyapunov function is

That is, under feedback control law , the Lyapunov function  decays to zero as the states return to the origin.

 Connect an integrator to input  so that the augmented system has input  and output states . The resulting augmented dynamical system is

which can be re-grouped as the single-integrator system

So the re-grouped system has the single-integrator structure of Equation (), and so the single-integrator backstepping procedure can be applied again.

This subsystem is stabilized by feedback control law , and the corresponding Lyapunov function is

That is, under feedback control law , the Lyapunov function  decays to zero as the states return to the origin.

 This process can continue for each integrator added to the system, and hence any system of the form

has the recursive structure

and can be feedback stabilized by finding the feedback-stabilizing control and Lyapunov function for the single-integrator  subsystem (i.e., with input  and output ) and iterating out from that inner subsystem until the ultimate feedback-stabilizing control  is known. At iteration , the equivalent system is

The corresponding feedback-stabilizing control law is

with gain . The corresponding Lyapunov function is

By this construction, the ultimate control  (i.e., ultimate control is found at final iteration ).
Hence, any system in this special many-integrator strict-feedback form can be feedback stabilized using a straightforward procedure that can even be automated (e.g., as part of an adaptive control algorithm).

Generic Backstepping

Systems in the special strict-feedback form have a recursive structure similar to the many-integrator system structure. Likewise, they are stabilized by stabilizing the smallest cascaded system and then backstepping to the next cascaded system and repeating the procedure. So it is critical to develop a single-step procedure; that procedure can be recursively applied to cover the many-step case. Fortunately, due to the requirements on the functions in the strict-feedback form, each single-step system can be rendered by feedback to a single-integrator system, and that single-integrator system can be stabilized using methods discussed above.

Single-step Procedure

Consider the simple strict-feedback system

where
 ,
Rather than designing feedback-stabilizing control  directly, introduce a new control  (to be designed later) and use control law

which is possible because . So the system in Equation () is

which simplifies to

This new -to- system matches the single-integrator cascade system in Equation (). Assuming that a feedback-stabilizing control law  and Lyapunov function  for the upper subsystem is known, the feedback-stabilizing control law from Equation () is

with gain . So the final feedback-stabilizing control law is

with gain . The corresponding Lyapunov function from Equation () is

Because this strict-feedback system has a feedback-stabilizing control and a corresponding Lyapunov function, it can be cascaded as part of a larger strict-feedback system, and this procedure can be repeated to find the surrounding feedback-stabilizing control.

Many-step Procedure

As in many-integrator backstepping, the single-step procedure can be completed iteratively to stabilize an entire strict-feedback system. In each step,
 The smallest "unstabilized" single-step strict-feedback system is isolated.
 Feedback is used to convert the system into a single-integrator system.
 The resulting single-integrator system is stabilized.
 The stabilized system is used as the upper system in the next step.
That is, any strict-feedback system

has the recursive structure

and can be feedback stabilized by finding the feedback-stabilizing control and Lyapunov function for the single-integrator  subsystem (i.e., with input  and output ) and iterating out from that inner subsystem until the ultimate feedback-stabilizing control  is known. At iteration , the equivalent system is

By Equation (), the corresponding feedback-stabilizing control law is

with gain . By Equation (), the corresponding Lyapunov function is

By this construction, the ultimate control  (i.e., ultimate control is found at final iteration ).
Hence, any strict-feedback system can be feedback stabilized using a straightforward procedure that can even be automated (e.g., as part of an adaptive control algorithm).

See also
 Nonlinear control
 Strict-feedback form
 Robust control
 Adaptive control

References

Nonlinear control